Proctotrupomorpha is a major subgrouping of the Apocrita within the Hymenoptera, containing mainly parasitic wasps. It contains the major groupings of Chalcidoidea, Diaprioidea, Proctotrupoidea, Cynipoidea and Platygastroidea, as well as the small Mymarommatoidea, and extinct groups like the Serphitoidea.

References

Apocrita
Insect infraorders